The 1971 New Mexico State Aggies football team was an American football team that represented New Mexico State University as an independent during the 1971 NCAA University Division football season. In their fourth year under head coach Jim Wood, the Aggies compiled a 5–5–1 record and outscored opponents by a total of 220 to 208. The team played its home games at Memorial Stadium in Las Cruces, New Mexico.

Schedule

References

New Mexico State
New Mexico State Aggies football seasons
New Mexico State Aggies football